Liubymivka is a village in Beryslav Raion (district) in Kherson Oblast of southern Ukraine, at about  northeast of the centre of Kherson city. It belongs to Novovorontsovka rural hromada, one of the hromadas of Ukraine.

The village came under attack by Russian forces in 2022, during the Russian invasion of Ukraine and was regained by Ukrainian forces by the beginning of October the same year.

Demographics
The settlement had 1965 inhabitants in 2001, native language distribution as of the Ukrainian Census of the same year:
Ukrainian: 96.46%
Russian: 2.54%
Armenian: 0.47%
Moldovan (Romanian): 0.29%
 Belarusian: 0.12%

References

Villages in Beryslav Raion